Forest of Death is a 2007 Hong Kong horror film directed, co-produced and co-written by Danny Pang, starring Shu Qi and Ekin Cheng.

Plot
Police detective Ha Chun-chi (Shu Qi) is investigating a rape and murder that took place in a mysterious forest that has also been the scene of many suicides. The main suspect in the murder case is Patrick Wong (Lawrence Chou), but he denies committing the crime.

Ha's investigation leads her to botanist Shum Shu-hoi (Ekin Cheng), who has been experimenting with plants from the forest. Shum's girlfriend, May (Rain Li), feigns interest in the forest to gain information for a tabloid television show she works for.

Shum's experiments reveal that the plants can act as witnesses in the murder case, and sets up a re-enactment of the crime in the forest, where the plants will act as lie detectors.

Cast
Shu Qi as Detective Ha Chun-chi
Ekin Cheng as Shum Shu-hoi
Rain Li as May
Lau Siu-ming as Mr. Tin, the forest ranger
Lam Suet as Commissioner Wong
Tommy Yuen as Shu-hoi's assistant
Lawrence Chou as Patrick Wong
Cub Chin as Producer

Release
Forest of Death was released on Region 3 DVD in Hong Kong by Universe Laser on 10 May 2007. It also screened out of competition at the 2007 Bangkok International Film Festival.

References

External links
 

2007 films
Hong Kong horror films
2007 horror films
Police detective films
Hong Kong supernatural horror films
Films directed by Danny Pang
Films set in Thailand
2000s Hong Kong films